Henrique Monteiro Correia da Silva (8 December 1878 – 2 November 1935), often referred to as Henrique Paço d'Arcos, was a Portuguese statesman, navy officer and colonial administrator.

Biography
Henrique Paço d'Arcos was a son of Carlos Eugénio Correia da Silva. He served as Governor of Macau from 23 August 1919 to 5 January 1923. During his tenure, he showed great diplomatic talent in his relationship with the Chinese government. Later, he served as Minister of the Colonies in Guimarães cabinet from 16 February to 1 July 1925.

Honours
Knight of Order of the Tower and Sword
Distinguished Service Order
Commander of Military Order of Aviz (11 March 1910)

Work
Memórias de Guerra no Mar

References

1878 births
1935 deaths
Governors of Macau
20th-century Macau people
Portuguese military officers
Commanders of the Order of Aviz
19th-century Portuguese people
20th-century Portuguese people